The Crystal Star is a bestselling 1994 Star Wars novel written by Vonda N. McIntyre and published by Bantam Spectra. The novel is set ten years after the Battle of Endor in the Star Wars expanded universe.

Plot

Background
Jacen and Jaina Solo are now five years old, and their brother Anakin is three, all at an age where they are easily manipulated.

Summary
On Munto Codro, Jacen, Jaina and Anakin are kidnapped by a man named Hethrir. Their mother Leia Organa Solo immediately dispatches a rescue operation. Meanwhile, Leia's husband Han Solo and brother Luke Skywalker go to Crseih Station on a supposed "vacation", and learn of a secret cult that influences the Crystal Star, which could possibly threaten the very existence of the galaxy.

Hethrir continues to manipulate the children for several days, as he leads the Empire Reborn, an organization looking to resurrect the Galactic Empire. Eventually, Leia and Chewbacca manage to rescue the children, but Hethrir is still connected to the events that transpire around the Crystal Star. After an intense series of events, Hethrir is killed, the Crystal Star explodes, Crseih station moves out of the area beforehand, and Luke, Leia, Han and the children are safe.

Reception
The Crystal Star was a New York Times Bestseller, and the sixth consecutive Star Wars novel to reach the bestseller list.

Critical reception was generally hostile.  It was dubbed "The most derided novel in the entire Expanded Universe" in a 2013 retrospective with criticized elements including recycled plot elements from other EU novels such as the Solo children being kidnapped and Luke losing his Force powers, as well as the novel's stranger aspects making little sense, such as centaurs and werewolves in a science-fiction settings and Luke joining Hethrir's "transparently evil" cult.

Editions
 The Crystal Star, 1st hardcover, 1994. Vonda McIntyre,

References

Further reading

External links
 

1994 novels
1994 science fiction novels
Star Wars Legends novels
Novels by Vonda McIntyre
Bantam Spectra books